Noah Cobb (born July 20, 2005) is an American professional soccer player who plays as a defender for Major League Soccer club Atlanta United.

Club career
Born in Chattanooga, Tennessee, Cobb played club soccer with Chattanooga FC, before joining the Atlanta United academy team's under-12 side. Cobb progressed through the academy, also appearing for the club's USL Championship side Atlanta United 2 eleven times during their 2021 season.

On March 23, 2022, Cobb signed a full professional contract with Atlanta United 2. In 2023, Cobb will become an Atlanta United player on a homegrown player deal.

References

2005 births
Living people
American soccer players
Association football defenders
Atlanta United 2 players
USL Championship players
Soccer players from Tennessee
Sportspeople from Chattanooga, Tennessee
Homegrown Players (MLS)
Atlanta United FC players
Chattanooga FC players